The Ewan Building is a historic commercial building at 124-128 Second Street in Clarendon, Arkansas. It is a single-story brick structure, with three storefronts demarcated by a metal pilasters and a pressed-metal facade. Built in 1904, it is one several buildings built on the block with a metal facade, giving the entire block a distinctive character. This area was used as a backdrop in the filming of A Soldier's Story.

The building was listed on the National Register of Historic Places in 1984.

See also
National Register of Historic Places listings in Monroe County, Arkansas

References

Commercial buildings on the National Register of Historic Places in Arkansas
Buildings and structures in Monroe County, Arkansas
National Register of Historic Places in Monroe County, Arkansas
Commercial buildings completed in 1903